Devil Mountain is a small shield volcano in the U.S. state of Alaska, located  south of the Devil Mountain Lakes and  northwest of Deering.

The mountain is part of the Espenberg volcanic field, a group of Pleistocene maars and shield volcanoes at the northern tip of the Seward Peninsula just south of the Arctic Circle.

Devil Mountain was named Teufelsberg by Lieutenant Otto von Kotzebue in 1816, which means Devils Mountain in the German language.

References

External links

Volcanoes of Alaska
Mountains of Alaska
Pleistocene shield volcanoes
Shield volcanoes of the United States